Visam Ali is a former High Commissioner of the Maldives to Malaysia. She was a Maldivian Member of Parliament representing Raa Atoll, Maduvvaree legislative district for the 18th sitting of Majlis of the Maldives.

From 26 March 2019 to 1 February 2020, she was the last Ambassador of the Maldives to Malaysia, when the Maldives returned to its status as a republic in the Commonwealth of Nations, then she became the High Commissioner as a result.

Career

Prior to her political career she was a civil servant and headed the Department of Higher Education and Training, during President Maumoon Abdul Gayoom's administration. With her spouse Ahmed Thasmeen Ali, then Vice Presidential Candidate of DRP, she signed to Maldivian Democratic Party after the defeat in the presidential elections in 2008.

Visam Ali has advocated for children and women's rights,  Health care for thalassemia patients, and submitted the Thalassemia control bill to the Peoples Majlis. She also advocated for the rights of fishermen in her constituency and criticized President Mohamed Nasheed's policy on using police against protestors in Maldives. She is one of the MP's who declined to receive the controversial MVR 20,000 committee allowance for MP's by Peoples Majlis.

She resigned from her position as High Commissioner on 5 April 2022.

References

{{s-aft Misna Shareef (acting)}}

1974 births
Living people
High Commissioners of the Maldives to Malaysia
Members of the People's Majlis
University of Adelaide alumni
Murdoch University alumni
Dhivehi Rayyithunge Party politicians
21st-century Maldivian women politicians
21st-century Maldivian politicians